The Cadillac Man is the pen name of a homeless white American writer who lived under the railroad viaduct in Astoria, Queens, New York City.  His book  Land of the Lost Souls: My Life on the Streets describes his experiences living on the streets. His notebooks have been excerpted in Esquire Magazine, and his writings on street life have appeared in The New York Times. A 2006 documentary about him, Cadillac Man: My Life Under The Viaduct, has appeared in 14 film festivals. In December, 2015, he moved into an apartment in Astoria.

Nickname
Cadillac Man does not publicly state his name, but says his nickname comes from being hit by Cadillac cars on different occasions in 1994.

Published works
Cadillac Man (2009). Land of the Lost Souls: My life on the Streets.  Bloomsbury USA. March 17, 2009.

See also
Hell's Kitchen, Manhattan

References

External links
Neighborhood Report New York Times, February 2005.
Homeless Man Pens New Role as Film Star NY Daily News, July 2005.
Judson Memorial Church Sermon New York, NY. 2005.

Year of birth missing (living people)
Unidentified people
Living people
American columnists
Homeless people
People from Astoria, Queens